The flag of Arizona consists of 13 rays of red and weld-yellow on the top half. The red and yellow symbolize the Spanish conquistadores that explored this part of America; this is because the flag is inspired in the current  flag of Spain. The center star signifies copper production; Arizona produces more copper than any other state in the US.

The height of the flag is two units high while the width is three units wide. The sun rays at the top are divided into 13 equal segments, starting with red and alternating with gold until the rays are complete. In the center of the flag, the copper star is one unit high, while the rest of the flag is covered by a blue section measuring one unit high and three units wide. The colors of red and blue are the same shade used on the flag of the United States.

History

The state of Arizona's website, museum, and official materials cite the following origins of the Arizona flag:

While Harris is credited with the creation of the Rifle Team flag, several individuals appear to have played a role in the design of the state's first official flag, including Rachael Berry, Arizona's first elected female state representative.  W. R. Stewart of Mesa was working in conjunction with Harris, who was the Arizona adjutant general and head of the Arizona National Guard. Stewart, as president of the Mesa Rifle Team, felt compelled to design a flag for competition. Reportedly, Stewart's wife Mae sewed the first flag for competition from a sketch he had made on the back of an envelope.  Carl Hayden, Arizona's first U.S. Representative, was reported to have been involved with Harris in designing the first state flag, and his wife, Nan Hayden, was responsible for sewing the first state flag.

Other individuals were also likely involved in its conception, design, and production. The Stewart and Harris version of the competition flag's origin is due to Stewart dropping some copper dye and white material into boiling water and the result was the copper color now seen on the flag. While some sources claim the rising sun of the earlier proposals was thought to resemble the Japanese flag and was therefore changed to the present star, most official sources (including official state documents) cite the Spanish flag and the influence of early Arizona explorers, such as the conquistadores Álvar Núñez Cabeza de Vaca and Francisco Vázquez de Coronado, as they searched unsuccessfully for the lost gold city of Cibola as the inspiration for the colors. However, these early explorers never used the current Spanish flag, which is of much more recent design (1785).

The flag was adopted on February 27, 1917, by the 3rd Arizona Legislature. It was passed into law without the signature of Governor Thomas Campbell. The governor did not officially state his reasons for taking no action on the bill.

In a 2001 poll conducted by the North American Vexillological Association, the Arizona flag was identified as one of the "10 best flags on the continent," ranking sixth of 72 North American flags for overall design quality.

See also

 Seal of Arizona
 List of Arizona state symbols

References

External links

 Arizona flag history
 https://web.archive.org/web/20120518050514/http://www.mesaaz.gov/planning/RobsonHistoricDistrict.aspx

Arizona
Symbols of Arizona